Tabley Superior is a civil parish in the Borough of Cheshire East and ceremonial county of Cheshire in England. In 2001, it had a population of 316.  The parish contains the village of Over Tabley.

See also

Listed buildings in Tabley Superior

References

Civil parishes in Cheshire